Technocracy is an EP by American heavy metal band Corrosion of Conformity. It was released in 1987 on Metal Blade Records and re-released in 1992 via Relativity Records with four additional songs, including three demo versions of songs from the EP with bassist Mike Dean singing.

Track listing 
"Technocracy" – 3:13
"Hungry Child" – 1:15
"Happily Ever After" – 4:22
"Crawling" – 4:23
"Ahh Blugh (Milking the Sick Farce)" – 0:31

Bonus tracks on Relativity re-release (demo)
"Intervention" - 2:10
"Technocracy" - 3:27
"Crawling" - 5:00
"Happily Ever After" - 4:34

Personnel
Simon Bob – lead vocals
Mike Dean – bass, lead vocals on bonus songs
Woody Weatherman – guitar
Reed Mullin – drums, vocals

References

1987 EPs
Corrosion of Conformity albums